RNTD may refer to:
 Royal Navy Torpedo Depot, see Royal Naval Armaments Depot
 RosettaNet Technical Dictionary